Sebastian Johansson (born 4 September 1980) is a Swedish football player, who plays midfielder for Örgryte IS.

Career
Starting his career in Ulricehamns IFK, he moved to Swedish side IFK Göteborg in 1997, he played for the club until 2005 and won Stora Silvret (eng: the big silver) in 2005, Lilla silvret (eng: the little silver) in 2004 and bronze in 2001, in 2006 he joined Turkish club Malatyaspor and played for the club both in the Süper Lig and the Bank Asya 1. Lig, before returning home to Sweden and Halmstads BK.

On 14 July 2009 Johansson was officially loan to Örgryte IS, with the reasons that he could not settle in Halmstad and the lack of playing time, he would play for Örgryte IS the rest of the season. On 11 January 2010 Örgryte IS announced that Sebastian Johansson had signed a 3-year contract with the club for an undisclosed fee.

He is nicknamed Seb by the IFK Göteborg supporters.

Achievements

IFK Göteborg:

 Allsvenskan:
 Stora Silvret (eng: big silver (2nd)): 2005
 Lilla Silvret (eng: little silver (3rd)): 2004
 Bronze: 2001

 Royal League
 Runner-up: 2005

References

External links
HBK Profile 
Örgryte IS Profile 
 

1980 births
Living people
Swedish footballers
Association football midfielders
Allsvenskan players
IFK Göteborg players
Malatyaspor footballers
Halmstads BK players
Örgryte IS players
Expatriate footballers in Turkey